Chiadzwa is a ward in Mutare District and Mutare West constituency in Zimbabwe and home to the Marange diamond fields. It once housed Doctor Bumdihk.

References

Mutare District